Aberdeen Centre is a shopping mall in Richmond, British Columbia. It is located in the Golden Village district on Hazelbridge Way, bordered by Cambie Road to the north.

History

The original Aberdeen Centre was built in 1989. It contained about 50 to 75 stores. The original Chinese name was "", which refers to the Chinese name of Aberdeen, Hong Kong. Envisioned as an "Asian mall" in anticipation of the coming wave of migration from Hong Kong due to the impending 1997 Handover of Hong Kong, Aberdeen Centre's developer Thomas Fung had trouble finding tenants initially since  there had been no Asian malls in North America in the 1980s. Fung offered to buy a 50 percent equity stake in any store setting up in Aberdeen with an option for tenants to buy back the shares with no interest if business flourished. Almost 95 percent successfully bought back the shares within a year of the mall's opening.

As new Asian malls such as Yaohan Centre and President Plaza opened, it soon became apparent that the original Aberdeen Centre was too small to compete. The current Aberdeen Centre, opened in 2003, is about three times the original mall's size and has around 100 stores.

There are restaurants on its upper floors. An indoor musical fountain, similar to the one in front of Bellagio Hotel in Las Vegas but smaller in scale, was built at the centre of the mall and performs shows every hour.

In 2006, the mall became home to the operations of Fairchild Group's Chinese-language TV and radio operations in Vancouver. Fairchild Radio (CJVB AM1470 and CHKG FM96.1) now has studios on the second floor, while Fairchild TV and Talentvision have their news studios on the third floor.

On August 8, 2008, the largest viewing party in the Vancouver area for the 2008 Summer Olympics took place at the mall, with thousands of spectators, some of whom had lined up since 3:30 in the morning.

The third phase of the development, Aberdeen Square, opened in 2013. It has three retail and three office levels.

Transportation
Access to the Canada Line, run by the SkyTrain system, is available through the mall's third phase, Aberdeen Square. The mall is connected directly to the Aberdeen Station via an overhead walkway to the northbound platform.

Public transit buses, serviced by TransLink, have connections to the mall, with routes serving Richmond and New Westminster.

Incidents
On February 9, 2006, a knife battle between four men occurred in the upper food court area of the mall. One man was fatally stabbed in the heart and died at the scene. Another was seriously injured, suffering a knife wound at the back. The two remaining men fled the scene.

On October 26, 2008, a middle-aged Asian man committed suicide by jumping down from the third floor near the food court area. He was pronounced dead at the scene. Richmond RCMP ruled out any foul play and believed it was an isolated suicide incident.

On September 15, 2016, masked suspects wielding hammers broke several display cases at a jewelry store before escaping in a stolen pickup truck. No injuries were reported.

Gallery

See also
 Chinese Canadians in British Columbia
 Golden Village (Richmond, British Columbia)
 Parker Place

References

Further reading
 "Aberdeen Centre expansion 75% sold" (Archive). Vancouver Sun at Canada.com. September 23, 2010.

External links
 

Shopping malls in Metro Vancouver
Buildings and structures in Richmond, British Columbia
Shopping malls established in 1989
1989 establishments in British Columbia